Western Australia politics takes place in context of a constitutional monarchy with a bicameral parliamentary system, and like other Australian states, Western Australia is part of the federation known as the Commonwealth of Australia.

The main parties are the governing Labor Party and the National Party. Other minor political parties include the  Liberal Party, Greens, Western Australia Party, Shooters, Fishers and Farmers Party, Liberal Democratic Party and Pauline Hanson's One Nation.

State government

The nominal head of the Government of Western Australia is the King of Australia, represented in the state by the Governor of Western Australia. Legislative power rests with the Crown and the two houses of the Parliament of Western Australia. The powers and responsibilities of the parliament are defined in the Constitution Act 1889.

Parliament of Western Australia

The Parliament of Western Australia is bicameral, consisting of a lower and an upper house.

The Western Australian Legislative Assembly (lower house) is composed of 59 members of parliament, each of whom represent a single electoral district and are elected using a preferential voting system. The Legislative Assembly currently sits for fixed four-year terms. The leader of the party with a majority in the Legislative Assembly (or with the confidence of the Assembly) is appointed by the Governor as the Premier of Western Australia.

The Western Australian Legislative Council (upper house) has 36 members (or MLCs), representing six electoral regions. Six members are elected for each province using a proportional voting system.

General elections are held every four years, electing the entire Legislative Assembly and Legislative Council. The next state election is scheduled for March 2025.

Federal politics

Western Australia is divided into 15 federal electoral divisions, each represented by a seat in the Australian House of Representatives. Like other Australian states, Western Australia is represented by twelve Senators in the Australian Senate, with six of those Senators elected for two three-year Senate terms at each half-Senate election.

Historically, most federal elections have already been decided by the time the polls close in Western Australia.  The only times in recent memory where the state has decided an election were:
 1998, when the first returns from the state assured a second term for John Howard.
 2010, when the victory of a state Nationals candidate who didn't identify with the federal party allowed Julia Gillard to stay in office with a minority government.
 2022,  when significant swings to Labor in a number of electorates helped Anthony Albanese become prime minister.

Notable Western Australia political figures
 John Forrest - first premier of Western Australia
 Edith Cowan - first Australian woman to serve as a member of parliament
 John Curtin - first and only Prime Minister of Australia to represent an electorate outside the Eastern states
 Carmen Lawrence - first woman to become Premier of a State of the Commonwealth of Australia
 Jo Vallentine - first person in the world elected to a parliament on a nuclear disarmament platform
 Mark McGowan - current premier of Western Australia
 Julie Bishop - first woman to be Foreign Minister and deputy leader of the federal Liberal Party
 Mia Davies - first woman to lead a branch of the Nationals at state or federal level and become State Opposition leader. 
 Ben Wyatt - first Aboriginal treasurer in an Australian state or federal government
 Ken Wyatt - first Aboriginal member of the House of Representatives and the first Indigenous federal minister
 Anne Aly - first female federal parliamentarian of Muslim faith

See also
 Premier of Western Australia
 Governor of Western Australia
 Secessionism in Western Australia

References